Aul is a Vidhan Sabha constituency of Kendrapara district, Odisha.

This constituency includes Aul block and Rajkanika block.

Elected Members

Sixteen elections were held between 1951 and 2019.
Elected members from the Aul constituency are:
 
2019: (98): Pratap Keshari Deb (BJD)
2014: (98): Devendra Sharma (Congress)
2009: (98): Pratap Keshari Deb (BJD)
2004: (30): Pratap Keshari Deb (BJD)
2000: (30): Pratap Keshari Deb (BJD)
1995: (30): Dolagobinda Nayak (Congress)
1990: (30): Sushree Devi (Janata Dal)
1985: (30): Dolagobinda Nayak (Congress)
1980: (30): Sarat Kumar Deb (JNP (SC))
1977: (30): Sarat Kumar Deb (Janata Party)
1974: (30): Sarat Kumar Deb (Swatantra)
1971: (28): Sarat Kumar Deb (Swatantra)
1967: (28): Dibakar Nath Sharma (Congress)
1961: (111): Sailendra Narayan Bhanj Deo (Congress)
1957: (79): Sailendra Narayan Bhanj Deo (Congress)
1951: (66): Sailendra Narayan Bhanj Deo (Independent)

2014 Election Candidates

2009 Election Results
In 2009 election, Biju Janata Dal candidate Pratap Keshari Deb defeated Indian National Congress candidate Devendra Sharma by a margin of 5,877 votes.

Notes

References

Assembly constituencies of Odisha
Kendrapara district